A turret deck ship is a type of merchant ship with an unusual hull, designed and built in the late 19th and early 20th centuries. The hulls of turret deck vessels were rounded and stepped inward above their waterlines. This gave some advantages in strength and allowed them to pay lower canal tolls under tonnage measurement rules then in effect. The type ceased to be built after those rules changed. There are no surviving examples.

Development
Turret deck ships were inspired by the visit of the US whaleback vessel  to Liverpool in 1891. Like others of the type, Wetmore had a hull in the form of a flattened cigar, with a continuous curve above the waterline to where the sides met amidships. The superstructure atop the hull was in round or oval "turrets", so named because of their resemblance to gunhouses on contemporary warships.

In 1893 William Doxford and Sons Ltd. ("Doxford") of Sunderland, England built one whaleback under license from the type's designer, but had already built its first turret deck ship to a design by Arthur Havers, the concern's chief draughtsman. Havers toned down the more radical features of the whaleback. His design retained conventional bows and sterns instead of the upswept conoid "snout" of the whaleback. Instead of a rounded hull, the hull of a turret vessel was stepped inward above the waterline, but the horizontal and vertical surfaces of the hull met in curves rather than by right angles as in conventional ships. Finally, the design joined the rounded turrets of whalebacks into one long and narrow rectangular structure (also called a "turret") of about half the beam, and used that space as part of the hold.

The design was patented and Doxford's first ship, Turret, was notable due to its abnormally long and wide hatches in the turret and self-trimming due to the rounded shape in the upper hold and lower turret and thus ideal for grain. With engines aft the design was seen as ideal for the bulk oil trade meeting the latest Suez Canal regulations in which coal bunkers would be separated from oil cargo by a double bulkhead filled with water. The vessel had an unusually high righting angle which was obtained whether full or lightly loaded. In particular the design was seen as a solution to the problem of strength and economical cost. On well deck ships the lack of a continuous line of the deck, one the turret ship design solved with a continuous line and solid structure up to the top of the turret, resulted in weakness with classification societies taking notice by requiring increased strengthening in construction. The long, wide hatches were seen as making the design especially suitable for carrying heavy or bulky machinery.

By March 1895 the design had considerable acceptance, with nine ships afloat; Turret, Turret Age, Turret Bay, Bencliff, Turret Bell, Progressist, Royalist, Hopedale and Forest Abbey, with five more under construction.

Description and design

In side profile, turret deck ships resembled other merchant vessels with flush decks or with small forecastles and poop decks. In cross-section the differences between turret deck vessels and more conventional ships are apparent. There was no gunwale; the vertical side of a turret ship curves inward above the load line to a horizontal plane. This flat area was known as the harbour deck. Further inboard, this "deck" arced to the vertical again by a reverse curve. That vertical plane then joined the weather deck atop the turret at a right angle. Structurally these elements were part of the hull, not of the superstructure, and the cargo holds of the ship extended up to the true weather deck atop the turret.

This design, and that of its near relative the trunk deck ship, were said to maximize strength, allowing larger vessels and reduced the amount of steel needed for construction. In reality, it is more likely that the geometry inhibited the development of cracks in the sheer strake but vessels to this design were not any lighter than conventional vessels due to their unique geometry. In operation their hull form promoted self-trimming of homogenous cargo and inhibited shifting.

The design also called for a cellular double bottom, which was the probable reason for claims of the type's exceptional hull strength, but it also raised the centre of gravity of the cargo. A higher centre of gravity increased the roll period and reduced the violence of rolls. But loading heavy cargo too high, and failing to properly ballast the bottom tanks, raised the centre of gravity and led to instability. This led to accidents, a Board of Trade investigation, and cautions from Doxford on proper loading. The design was also inconvenient, as the narrowness of the turret made for smaller cargo hatches and restricted habitation spaces in the superstructure atop the turret.

Turret deck ships had a low net tonnage (an approximate measure of cargo space) in comparison to their deadweight capacity (weight of cargo), allowing them to operate at a lower fee structure than a conventional hull. Net tonnage is a computation of volume, and the method of measurement used at the Suez Canal to determine tolls was based on a measure of net tonnage which excluded some of the cargo spaces of these unconventional hulls. Turret and trunk deck ships therefore paid less in tolls than conventional ships of the same capacity.

In 1911, the toll measure changed at Suez to account for all cargo spaces, and contemporaneous refinements in the design of ships of more conventional hull form eliminated the structural advantages of turret deck ships. Construction of the type therefore ceased.

History of use

Over 180 ships of the type had been built before the design was abandoned, 176 of them by William Doxford and Sons. They were used in both line voyage and tramp service until retired, wrecked, or lost in the First or Second World War. The British Clan Line, which traded globally in cargos such as foodstuffs, timber, metals, manufactured goods, case oil, jute, tea, nitrates, and general cargo, used 32 of the type.

While used for general freight, these ships were particularly suited to the carriage of bulk cargos such as grains, coal, and ores. Several were sold to Canadian interests for use in the latter trades on the Saint Lawrence River and Great Lakes of North America. The last of them, Turret Cape, operated until mid-century and was not scrapped until 1959. Only the former Nonsuch was in operation a little longer. The ship was kept in business as Hermann Fritzen until 1959 by owner Johs. Fritzen & Sohn of Emden. Finally sold for demolition in April 1959, Hermann Fritzen arrived for breaking at Eckhardt & Co. in Hamburg in the first quarter of 1960.

See also

References

Notes

Sources

Photographs
 Colour photographs of model of SS Nonsuch, a highly detailed full-hull builder's model in the collections of the National Maritime Museum. Nonsuch was built by Doxford in 1906 for Bowles Brothers and lost to air attack in 1944. 
 SS Claverly Wreck Report, showing a stern view of SS Claverley showing narrow harbour decks a short distance above the water. Claverley, was built by Doxford in 1907, owned by Sutherland Steamship Company, and torpedoed by a German U-boat near the Eddystone in 1917.  That source also reproduces pages 70–71 of Hardy (1924), with figure 28 showing a midships cross-section of a turret vessel.
 Photographs of four vessels in Great Lakes service from the Historical Collections of the Great Lakes can be found by searching on the Great Lakes Vessels Online Index maintained by Bowling Green State University and entering the word "Turret" in the vessel name keyword search field. The photograph of Turret Chief shows a heavily laden vessel with harbour decks nearly awash.

British inventions
Naval architecture
Ship types
Shipbuilding